Målarryggen ("The Painter Ridge") is a mountain ridge in Haakon VII Land at Spitsbergen, Svalbard. It has a length of about three kilometers, and is located between the glaciers of Hakebreen and Tinayrebreen. The ridge is named in honor of the French painter Jean Paul Louis Tinayre.

References

Mountains of Spitsbergen